The following is a list of all the episodes that featured in all 14 series of London's Burning (1988–2002). This list includes the original 1986 TV film that the series was based on and the Christmas special "Ding Dong Merrily", which aired between Series 1 and Series 2 . Additionally it is the only episode of London's Burning with a title.

Episodes

TV Movie (1986)

Series 1 (1988)

Christmas Special (1988)

Series 2 (1989)

Series 3 (1990)

Series 4 (1991)

Series 5 (1992)

Series 6 (1993)

Series 7 (1994)

Series 8 (1995)

Series 9 (1996–1997)

Series 10 (1997–1998)

Series 11 (1998–1999)

Series 12 (2000)

Series 13 (2001)

Series 14 (2002)

Notes

References

Lists of British drama television series episodes
London-related lists